Julius Lippert (12 April 1839 – 12 December 1909) was an Austrian cultural historian and politician in Bohemia.

Lippert was born in Braunau (Broumov) and died in Prague.

Literary works 
 Allgemeine Geschichte des Priestertums, 2 Vols., 1883–1884
 Kulturgeschichte der Menschheit in ihrem organischen Aufbau, 2 Vols., 1886–1887
 Deutsche Sittengeschichte, 3 Vols., 1889
 Sozialgeschichte Böhmens, 2 Vols., 1896–1898

External links 
 http://www.phil.muni.cz/fil/scf/komplet/liprt.html 
 https://web.archive.org/web/20061118023604/http://www.obcebroumovska.cz/broumovsko/broumovsko_osobnosti.php 
 Ëèïïåðò Þëèóñ (Lippert Julius) - Ïåðñîíàëèè at www.countries.ru 
 OZON.ru - Þëèóñ Ëèïïåðò at www.ozon.ru 

1839 births
1909 deaths
19th-century Austrian historians
19th-century Austrian politicians
Cultural historians
Austrian politicians
German Bohemian people
People from Broumov